Chloroclystis hawkinsi is a moth in the family Geometridae. It is endemic to South Africa.

References

External links

Moths described in 1982
hawkinsi
Endemic moths of South Africa